ASCC may refer to:
 Alaska Systems Coordinating Council
 Air Standardization Coordinating Committee, an organisation tasked with enhancing coalition military aviation
 Air Station Cape Cod, a United States Coast Guard facility in Massachusetts
 American Samoa Community College
Army Service Component Command
 Automatic Sequence Controlled Calculator, known as the Harvard Mark I, a World War II-era electro-mechanical computer